Eric Loughran (born April 12, 1995) is an American male freestyle skier. He competed in the men's aerials at the 2018 Winter Olympics. He competed at the 2022 Winter Olympics.

References

External links

1995 births
Living people
American male freestyle skiers
Freestyle skiers at the 2018 Winter Olympics
Freestyle skiers at the 2022 Winter Olympics
Olympic freestyle skiers of the United States
Sportspeople from Lowell, Massachusetts
21st-century American people